Yuri Valentinovich Knorozov (alternatively Knorosov; ; 19 November 1922 – 31 March 1999) was a Soviet and Russian linguist, epigrapher and ethnographer, he became the founder of the Soviet school of Mayan studies,  and he deciphered the Mayan script when he learned that the world scientific community considered it impossible. He is renowned for the pivotal role his research played in the decipherment of the Maya script, the writing system used by the pre-Columbian Maya civilization of Mesoamerica. today known as southern Mexico and Centro America.

Early life 
Knorozov was born in the village of Yuzhny near Kharkiv, at that time the capital of the newly formed Ukrainian SSR. His parents were Russian intellectuals, and his paternal grandmother Maria Sakhavyan had been a stage actress of national repute in Armenia.

At school, the young Yuri was a difficult and somewhat eccentric student, who made indifferent progress in a number of subjects and was almost expelled for poor and willful behavior. Aged 5, he sustained a heavy injury to his head that nearly left him blind. However, it became clear that he was academically bright with an inquisitive temperament; he was an accomplished violinist, wrote romantic poetry and could draw with accuracy and attention to detail. His scores were excellent for all subjects, except for Ukrainian language.

In 1940 at the age of 17, Knorozov left Kharkiv for Moscow where he commenced undergraduate studies in the newly created Department of Ethnology at Moscow State University's department of History. He initially specialised in Egyptology.

Military service and the "Berlin Affair" 
 

Knorozov's study plans were soon interrupted by the outbreak of World War II hostilities along the Eastern Front in mid-1941. Due to his poor health, Knorozov was unfit for regular military service in the Soviet Army; however, he and his family spent most of 1941–1943 years on the German-occupied territories, where he could be forced to join the German army support units. Knorozov managed to avoid that by moving from village to village, where he earned his living as a school teacher. In 1943, Knorozov survived an outbreak of typhus, and in September of that year managed to escape with his family to Moscow. There he resumed his Egyptology studies, at the Moscow State University. In 1944, he was unexpectedly recalled for a military service, but his father, who was a colonel in the Soviet Army, arranged for him a place of a telephone operator in an artillery unit stationed near Moscow.

According to a popular legend, Knorozov and his unit supported the push of the Red Army vanguard into Berlin. There, Knorozov is supposed to have by chance retrieved a book which would spark his later interest in and association with deciphering the Maya script. The legend has been much reproduced, particularly following the 1992 publication of Michael D. Coe's Breaking the Maya Code. Supposedly, when stationed in Berlin, Knorozov came across the National Library while it was ablaze. Somehow he managed to retrieve from the fire a book, which remarkably enough turned out to be a rare edition containing reproductions of the three Maya codices which were then known as the Dresden, Madrid and Paris codices. Knorozov is said to have taken this book back with him to Moscow at the end of the war, where its examination would form the basis for his later pioneering research into the Maya script.

Although many details of Knorozov's life during the war remained unclear, his student Galina Ershova could not find any evidence that he traveled outside of Moscow Oblast in 1943–1945. Knorozov himself, in an interview conducted a year before his death, denied the Berlin legend. As he explained to the Mayanist epigrapher Harri Kettunen:

"Unfortunately it was a misunderstanding: I told about it [finding books in a library in Berlin] to my colleague Michael Coe, but he didn't get it right. There wasn't any fire in the library. And the books that were in the library, were in boxes to be sent somewhere else. The Germans had packed them, and since they didn't have time to move them anywhere, the boxes were taken to Moscow."

Resumption of studies 

In the autumn of 1945 after World War II, Knorozov returned to Moscow State University to complete his undergraduate courses at the department of Ethnography. He resumed his research into Egyptology, and also undertook comparative cultural studies in other fields such as Sinology. He displayed a particular interest and aptitude for the study of ancient languages and writing systems, especially hieroglyphs, and he also read medieval Japanese and Arabic literature. According to his roommate, Sevʹyan I. Vainshtein, Knorozov was entirely devoting himself to science. After receiving a scholarship, he would spend it on books, surviving on meager food until the next scholarship.

While still an undergraduate at MSU, Knorozov found work at the N.N. Miklukho-Maklai Institute of Ethnology and Anthropology (or IEA), part of the prestigious Academy of Sciences of the USSR. Knorozov's later research findings would be published by the IEA under its imprint.

As part of his ethnographic curriculum Knorozov spent several months as a member of a field expedition to the Central Asian Soviet republics of the Uzbek and Turkmen SSRs (what had formerly been the Khorezm PSR, and would much later become the independent nations of Uzbekistan and Turkmenistan following the 1991 breakup of the Soviet Union). On this expedition his ostensible focus was to study the effects of Russian expansionary activities and modern developments upon nomadic ethnic groups, of what was a far-flung frontier world of the Soviet state.

At this point the focus of his research had not yet been drawn on the Maya script. This would change in 1947, when at the instigation of his professor, Knorozov wrote his dissertation on the "de Landa alphabet", a record produced by the 16th century Spanish Bishop Diego de Landa in which he claimed to have transliterated the Spanish alphabet into corresponding Maya hieroglyphs. De Landa, who during his posting to Yucatán had overseen the destruction of all the codices from the Maya civilization he could find, reproduced his alphabet in a work (Relación de las Cosas de Yucatán) intended to justify his actions once he had been placed on trial when recalled to Spain. The original document had disappeared, and this work was unknown until 1860s when an abridged copy was discovered in the archives of the Spanish Royal Academy by the French scholar, Charles Étienne Brasseur de Bourbourg.

Since de Landa's "alphabet" seemed to be contradictory and unclear (e.g., multiple variations were given for some of the letters, and some of the symbols were not known in the surviving inscriptions), previous attempts to use this as a key for deciphering the Maya writing system had not been successful.

Key research 

In 1952, the then 30-year-old Knorozov published a paper which was later to prove to be a seminal work in the field (Drevnyaya pis’mennost’ Tsentral’noy Ameriki, or "Ancient Writing of Central America".) The general thesis of this paper put forward the observation that early scripts such as ancient Egyptian and Cuneiform which were generally or formerly thought to be predominantly logographic or even purely ideographic in nature, in fact contained a significant phonetic component. That is to say, rather than the symbols representing only or mainly whole words or concepts, many symbols in fact represented the sound elements of the language in which they were written, and had alphabetic or syllabic elements as well, which if understood could further their decipherment. By this time, this was largely known and accepted for several of these, such as Egyptian hieroglyphs (the decipherment of which was famously commenced by Jean-François Champollion in 1822 using the tri-lingual Rosetta Stone artefact); however the prevailing view was that Mayan did not have such features. Knorozov's studies in comparative linguistics drew him to the conclusion that the Mayan script should be no different from the others, and that purely logographic or ideographic scripts did not exist.

Knorozov's key insight was to treat the Maya glyphs represented in de Landa's alphabet not as an alphabet, but rather as a syllabary. He was perhaps not the first to propose a syllabic basis for the script, but his arguments and evidence were the most compelling to date. He maintained that when de Landa had commanded of his informant to write the equivalent of the Spanish letter "b" (for example), the Maya scribe actually produced the glyph which corresponded to the syllable, /be/, as spoken by de Landa. Knorozov did not actually put forward many new transcriptions based on his analysis; nevertheless, he maintained that this approach was the key to understanding the script. In effect, the de Landa "alphabet" was to become almost the "Rosetta stone" of Mayan decipherment.

A further critical principle put forward by Knorozov was that of synharmony. According to this, Mayan words or syllables which had the form consonant-vowel-consonant (CVC) were often to be represented by two glyphs, each representing a CV-syllable (i.e., CV-CV). In the reading, the vowel of the second was meant to be ignored, leaving the reading (CVC) as intended. The principle also stated that when choosing the second CV glyph, it would be one with an echo vowel that matched the vowel of the first glyph syllable. Later analysis has proved this to be largely correct.

Critical reactions to his work 

Upon the publication of this work from a then hardly known scholar, Knorozov and his thesis came under some severe and at times dismissive criticism. J. Eric S. Thompson, the noted British scholar regarded by most as the leading Mayanist of his day, led the attack. Thompson's views at that time were solidly anti-phonetic, and his own large body of detailed research had already fleshed-out a view that the Maya inscriptions did not record their actual history, and that the glyphs were founded on ideographic principles. His view was the prevailing one in the field, and many other scholars followed suit.

According to Michael Coe, "during Thompson's lifetime, it was a rare Maya scholar who dared to contradict" him on the value of Knorozov's contributions or on most other questions. As a result, decipherment of Maya scripts took much longer than their Egyptian or Hittite counterparts and could only take off after Thompson's demise in 1975.

The situation was further complicated by Knorozov's paper appearing during the height of the Cold War, and many were able to dismiss his paper as being founded on misguided Marxist-Leninist ideology and polemic. Indeed, in keeping with the mandatory practices of the time, Knorozov's paper was prefaced by a foreword written by the journal's editor which contained digressions and propagandist comments extolling the State-sponsored approach by which Knorozov had succeeded where Western scholarship had failed. However, despite claims to the contrary by several of Knorozov's detractors, Knorozov himself never did include such polemic in his writings.

Progress of decipherment 
Knorozov further improved his decipherment technique in his 1963 monograph "The Writing of the Maya Indians" and published translations of Mayan manuscripts in his 1975 work "Maya Hieroglyphic Manuscripts".

During the 1960s, other Mayanists and researchers began to expand upon Knorozov's ideas. Their further field-work and examination of the extant inscriptions began to indicate that actual Maya history was recorded in the stelae inscriptions, and not just calendric and astronomical information. The Russian-born but American-resident scholar Tatiana Proskouriakoff was foremost in this work, eventually convincing Thompson and other doubters that historical events were recorded in the script.

Other early supporters of the phonetic approach championed by Knorozov included Michael D. Coe and David Kelley, and whilst initially they were in a clear minority, more and more supporters came to this view as further evidence and research progressed.

Through the rest of the decade and into the next, Proskouriakoff and others continued to develop the theme, and using Knorozov's results and other approaches began to piece together some decipherments of the script. A major breakthrough came during the first round table or Mesa Redonda conference at the Maya site of Palenque in 1973, when using the syllabic approach those present (mostly) deciphered what turned out to be a list of former rulers of that particular Maya city-state.

Subsequent decades saw many further such advances, to the point now where quite a significant portion of the surviving inscriptions can be read. Most Mayanists and accounts of the decipherment history apportion much of the credit to the impetus and insight provided by Knorozov's contributions, to a man who had been able to make important contributions to the understanding of this distant, ancient civilisation. In retrospect, Prof. Coe writes that "Yuri Knorozov, a man who was far removed from the Western scientific establishment and who, prior to the late 1980s, never saw a Mayan ruin nor touch a real Mayan inscription, had nevertheless, against all odds, "made possible the modern decipherment of Maya hieroglyphic writing."

Later life 
Knorozov had presented his work in 1956 at the International Congress of Americanists in Copenhagen, but in the ensuing years he was not able to travel abroad at all.  After diplomatic relations between Guatemala and the Soviet Union were restored in 1990, Knorozov was invited by President Vinicio Cerezo to visit Guatemala. President Cerezo awarded Knorozov the Order of the Quetzal and Knorozov visited several of the major Mayan archaeological sites, including Tikal.  The government of Mexico awarded Knorozov the Order of the Aztec Eagle, the highest decoration awarded by the Mexican state to non-citizens, in a ceremony at the Mexican Embassy in Moscow on 30 November 1994. While receiving the award, he said in Spanish Mi corazón siempre es mexicano (My heart always remains with Mexico).

Knorozov had broad interests in, and contributed to, other investigative fields such as archaeology, semiotics, human migration to the Americas, and the evolution of the mind. However, it is his contributions to the field of Maya studies for which he is best remembered.

In his very last years, Knorozov is also known to have pointed to a place in the United States as the likely location of Chicomoztoc, the ancestral land from which—according to ancient documents and accounts considered mythical by a sizable number of scholars—indigenous peoples now living in Mexico are said to have come.

Knorozov died in Saint Petersburg on 31 March 1999, of pneumonia in the corridors of a city hospital. He was survived by his
daughter Ekaterina and granddaughter Anna.

List of publications 
An incomplete listing of Knorozov's papers, conference reports and other publications, divided by subject area and type. Note that several of those listed are re-editions and/or translations of earlier papers.

Knorozov listed his cat Asya as a co-author on his work, but the editors always removed her. He always used the photo with Asya (above) as his author photo, and got annoyed when editors cropped her out.

Maya-related 
Conference papers

Journal articles

Books

 (Knorozov's doctoral dissertation)

Others 
 (on the Rongorongo script, with N.A. Butinov)
 (Collated results of a research team under Knorozov investigating the Harappan script, with the use of computers)
 (on the Harappan script of the Indus Valley civilization)

References

Cited sources

Further reading 

 
 

Moran, Gordon, 1998, Silencing Scientists and Scholars in Other Fields, Greenwich, CT: Ablex.

External links

 
 Photograph of Y.V. Knorozov, at the Archaeology and Informatics Sector, Siberian Division of the Russian Academy of Sciences
 Finding aid to the Yuri Valentinovich Knorozov papers, 1945–1998 at Dumbarton Oaks

1922 births
1999 deaths
20th-century linguists
20th-century Mesoamericanists
20th-century Russian historians
Deaths from pneumonia in Russia
Epigraphers
Historical linguists
Linguists from Russia
Linguists from the Soviet Union
Mayanists
Mesoamerican epigraphers
Moscow State University alumni
Recipients of the USSR State Prize
Rongorongo
Russian Mesoamericanists
Russian people of Armenian descent
Soviet historians
Soviet military personnel of World War II